Leopold Querfeld (born 20 December 2003) is an Austrian professional footballer who plays as a centre-back for Rapid Wien.

Career
Querfeld is a youth product of Union Mauer, and moved to the academy of Rapid Wien in 2012. He began training with their reserves in 2020, and debuted for the first team in a 3–1 UEFA Europa League loss to Dinamo Zagreb on 4 November 2021.

International career
Querfeld is a youth international for Austria, having represented the Austria U18s and U19s.

References

External links
 
 OEFB Profile

2002 births
Living people
Footballers from Vienna
Austrian footballers
Austria youth international footballers
SK Rapid Wien players
Austrian Football Bundesliga players
2. Liga (Austria) players
Austrian Regionalliga players
Association football defenders